Lesogorsky is an urban locality (an urban-type settlement) in Vyborgsky District of Leningrad Oblast, located on the left bank of the Vuoksi River, on the Karelian Isthmus, near the Russia–Finland border, and a station of the Kamennogorsk–Svetogorsk–Imatra railway. Population: 

Municipally, Lesogorsky together with the town of Svetogorsk form Svetogorskoye Urban Settlement of Vyborgsky Municipal District.

History

Early history 
Jääski was first mentioned in 1323 in the Treaty of Nöteborg as one of the three pogosts given to Sweden by Novgorod, the other two being Äyräpää and Savilahti (Mikkeli).

Ruokolahti was a part of the Jääski parish until 1572, while Joutseno was a part of the Jääski parish until 1639.

Acquisition by Russia 
Russia acquired the area in 1721 after the Great Northern War in the Treaty of Nystad. Until 1918 it was a part of Vyborg Governorate, which after 1812 belonged to the Grand Duchy of Finland and was known as the Viipuri Province.

Finnish rule 

In 1917, Finland became independent, and the town became the administrative center of the Jääski municipality of the Viipuri Province. The industrial area of Enso, later Svetogorsk, was also a part of Jääski.

Soviet and Russian rule 
The territory had been ceded by Finland to the Soviet Union by the Moscow Peace Treaty as a result of the Winter War. It was recaptured by Finns between 1941 and 1944 during Continuation War but was again ceded to Soviets after Moscow Armistice. This secession was formalized after signing Paris Peace Treaty in 1947. The Viipuri Province was divided, with the larger part ceded to Soviet Union and the smaller part remaining in Finland. The population was resettled to Finland, mainly to Elimäki, Anjala and Kuusankoski, while people from Central Russia were resettled to populate the Karelian Isthmus. The northwesternmost parts of the Jääski municipality remained Finnish and were mainly used to form Imatra.

In March 1940 Yaskinsky District with the administrative center in Jääski was established, and Jääski obtained work settlement status. The district was a part of the Karelian Autonomous Soviet Socialist Republic, after March 31, 1940 of the Karelo-Finnish Soviet Socialist Republic. On November 24, 1944, Yaskinsky District was transferred from Karelo-Finnish Soviet Socialist Republic to Leningrad Oblast. On October 1, 1948 the district was renamed Lesogorsky, and on January 13, 1949 Jääski was renamed Lesogorsky. On December 9, 1960 Lesogorsky District was abolished and merged into Vyborgsky District.

Economy

Industry
In Lesogorsky, there is a plant producing plastic and fibers. There is a power plant on the Vuoksi.

Transportation
Lesogorsky is connected by railway with Kamennogorsk, where it has connection to the old Vyborg–Joensuu railroad. There is suburban traffic to Vyborg.
The continuation of the railroad beyond Svetogorsk to the state border is disused.

Lesogorsky is connected by roads with Kamennogorsk and Vyborg, as well as with Imatra across the border via Svetogorsk.

References

Notes

Sources

Urban-type settlements in Leningrad Oblast
Karelian Isthmus